Karachi cuisine refers to the food found mainly in the city of Karachi, Sindh, Pakistan. It is a multicultural cuisine as a result of the city consisting of various ethnic groups from different parts of Pakistan. Karachi is considered the melting pot of Pakistan.

The cuisine of Karachi is strongly influenced by the city's Muhajir population, who came from various parts of British India and settled primarily in Karachi after the independence of Pakistan in 1947. Most Urdu speaking Muslims have traditionally been based in Karachi, hence the city is known for multi cultural tastes in its cuisine. These Muslims maintained their old established culinary traditions, including variety of dishes and beverages.

Karachi cuisine is renowned for its cultural fusion, due to various empires and peoples living in this mega city. As a result many multi ethnic cuisines collaboratively had an influence on the style of Karachi food. The Pakistani cuisines such as Sindhi cuisine, Punjabi cuisine, Pashtun cuisine,  Kalash cuisine, Saraiki cuisine,  Kashmiri cuisine,  Balochi cuisine, Chitrali cuisine and other regional cuisines have also influenced the cuisine of Karachi.

Historical influences
The arrival of Islam within South Asia influenced the local cuisine to a great degree. The influence of the Central Asian, South Asian and Middle Eastern cuisine in Pakistani food is ubiquitous. Since Muslims are forbidden to eat pork or consume alcohol and the Halal dietary guidelines are strictly observed, Pakistanis focus on other areas of food such as Beef, Lamb, Chicken, Fish, and Vegetables as well as traditional Fruit and Dairy.

Dishes

 Aloo (potato) cholay (peas)
 Aloo (potato) chaat
 Aloo (potato) paratha
 Anda (egg) paratha
 Bakarkhani or Baqerkhani
 Bihari kebab
 Bun kebab
 Chargha
 Chicken karahi
 Chicken tikka
 Dalcha (also called Dal gosht)
 Double ka meetha (also called Shahi tukra)
 Falooda
 Firni
 Gajar ka halwa
 Gobhi (cauliflower) paratha
 Golgappay
 Haleem
 Halwa poori
 Hyderabadi biryani
 Jalebi
 Kachori
 Karri or karhi
 Kata-kat
 Kheer
 Kofta (Urdu:كوفته)
 Kulcha (Urdu: کلچه)
 Lukhmi (Urdu: لقمی)
 Namak para
 Nargisi kofta
 Nihari, a popular national dish in Pakistan, was originally brought by Muhajirs (immigrants) from Delhi, India.
 Paan (Urdu: پان), a traditional Muhajir betel leaf stimulant
 Pakora (Urdu: پکوڑا)
 Pasanda(Urdu: پسندے)
 Pulao (Urdu: پلاؤ)
 Qorma (Urdu: قورمه)
 Rabri
 Raita
 Ras malai
 Sajji
 Samosa
 Seekh kebab
 Shami kebab
 Shawarma
 Sheer korma or Sheer khurma
 Sheermal or Shirmal (Urdu: شیرمال)
 Siri paya
 Taftan (Urdu: تافتان)
 Ajwain Paratha
 Anday wala Burger (Egg Burger)
 Chana Chaat
 Boti Kebab
 Channa Dal paratha
 Dahi Baray
 Dhaniya Paratha
 Fry Kebab
 Galawati Kebab
 Gil e firdaus
 Gola Kebab
 Habshi Halwa
 Kache Qeema Kebab
 Kaleji (liver) Kabab
 Kebab roll
 Lamb karahi
 Lamb Tikka
 Lauki ka Paratha
 Lauki Ka Halwa
 Mashed dal Paratha
 Mattar (peas) Paratha
 Methi (fenugreek leaves) wala Paratha
 Mooli (Reddish ) Paratha
 Murgh -e- Musallam
 Pyaz (onion) ka Paratha
 Qeema Naan
 Qeema Paratha
 Reshmi Kebab
 Rizala
 Rumali Roti (Urdu: رومالی روٹی)
 Shab Daig
 Sultani Dal
 Tandoori Paratha
 Tahihri (rice colored yellow with potato)
 Warqui (layered) Paratha
 Zamin Doz Macchli (fish stuffed with spices and sealed in earthenware case which is then cooked for 8 hours)

Gallery

See also
 Pakistani cuisine
 Sindhi cuisine
 Punjabi cuisine
 Pashtun cuisine
 Kalash cuisine
 Saraiki cuisine
 Kashmiri cuisine
 Balochi cuisine
 Chitrali cuisine

References

 
 
Muhajir history
 
Food watchlist articles